Mario Cristian Mitoi (born 13 August 2004) is a Romanian professional footballer who plays as a defensive midfielder for Liga II club Oțelul Galați, on loan from FC Argeș Pitești.

Career statistics

Club

References

External links
 
 

2004 births
Living people
Romanian footballers
Romania youth international footballers
Association football midfielders
Liga I players
Liga II players
Liga III players
FC Argeș Pitești players
ASC Oțelul Galați players
Sportspeople from Pitești